The Brabham BT11 (also known as Repco Brabham BT11) is a Formula One racing car built in 1964, mainly for use by privateers in grand prix racing, but was also used by the Brabham works team during 1964 and 1965. It was the only competitive car of the period available to privateers, recording eight podium finishes in total. The car's best results came at consecutive events in the United States and Mexico 1965, with Dan Gurney qualifying and finishing second in the latter.

It was in a BT11 that 1970 World Champion Jochen Rindt debuted in Grand Prix racing. John Taylor however died four weeks after suffering severe burns in an accident with Jacky Ickx's Matra at the 1966 German Grand Prix.

The BT11 was also raced in the popular off season Tasman Series.

Complete Formula One World Championship results
(key) (results in bold indicate pole position, results in italics indicate fastest laps)

 Points were awarded on a 9–6–4–3–2–1 basis for the first six positions at each round. Only the best placed car from each chassis manufacturer-engine manufacturer combination at each round was eligible to score points. Not all rounds could be counted towards the championship:
In 1964 and 1965, only the best six round results were retained.
In 1966 only the best five round results were retained.
In 1967, the best five results from the first six rounds and the best four results from the last five rounds were retained.
In 1968, the best five results from the first six rounds and the best five results from the last six rounds were retained.
Numbers without parentheses are Championship points; numbers in parentheses are total points scored.
 In 1964, 5 of Brabham-Climax's points were scored using the BT11; the remaining 25 points were scored using a BT7
 In 1968, all of Brabham-Repco's points were scored using BT20, BT24 and BT26 models

References 

Brabham BT11